Callipodida is an order of millipedes containing around 130 species, many characterized by crests or ridges.

Description
A dorsal groove is present running down the mid-line of the body, and many species are ornamented with longitudinal crests or ridges. Sexually mature males possess a single pair of gonopods, consisting of the modified anterior leg pair of the 7th body segment, and carried concealed within a pouch.

Distribution
Callipodida occurs in North America, Europe, west Asia, southern China and Southeast Asia.

Classification
The living (extant) Callipodida are classified into three suborders, seven families, and approximately 130 species. The genus Sinocallipus, which constitutes the suborder Sinocallipodidea, is thought to be the most primitive, and a sister group to all 
other callipodans. A fourth, extinct, suborder was described in 2019 to accommodate Burmanopetalum inexpectatum, a 99 million-year-old specimen found in Burmese amber.

Suborder Callipodidea 
Callipodidae 
Suborder Schizopetalidea
Abacionidae
Caspiopetalidae
Dorypetalidae
Paracortinidae
Schizopetalidae
Suborder Sinocallipodidea
Sinocallipodidae
Suborder Burmanopetalidea 
Burmanopetalidae

References

External links

 
Millipede orders